Sparland is a village in Marshall County, Illinois, United States. The population was 366 at the 2020 census, down from 406 in 2010. It is part of the Peoria Metropolitan Statistical Area.

Geography

Sparland is in western Marshall County, on the west side of the Illinois River. The Lacon Bridge carrying Illinois Route 17 connects Sparland with Lacon, the Marshall county seat. IL 17 leads east  to Wenona and west  to Wyoming. Illinois Route 29 runs through Sparland as Railroad Street, leading northeast up the Illinois River valley  to Henry and southwest (downriver)  to Chillicothe.

From this vantage point there are beautiful views over the Illinois Valley looking east toward Lacon.

Demographics

As of the census of 2000, there were 504 people, 185 households, and 143 families residing in the village. The racial makeup of the village was 99.01% White, 0.40% from other races, and 0.60% from two or more races. Hispanic or Latino of any race were 1.59% of the population.

There were 185 households, out of which 34.1% had children under the age of 18 living with them, 65.4% were married couples living together, 7.6% had a female householder with no husband present, and 22.2% were non-families. 18.9% of all households were made up of individuals, and 7.6% had someone living alone who was 65 years of age or older. The average household size was 2.72 and the average family size was 3.04.

In the village, the population was spread out, with 26.2% under the age of 18, 8.9% from 18 to 24, 28.8% from 25 to 44, 21.6% from 45 to 64, and 14.5% who were 65 years of age or older. The median age was 34 years. For every 100 females, there were 107.4 males. For every 100 females age 18 and over, there were 110.2 males.

The median income for a household in the village was $32,019, and the median income for a family was $36,750. Males had a median income of $24,063 versus $19,028 for females. The per capita income for the village was $13,924. About 3.7% of families and 5.8% of the population were below the poverty line, including 8.2% of those under age 18 and none of those age 65 or over.

References

Villages in Marshall County, Illinois
Villages in Illinois
Peoria metropolitan area, Illinois